Stambaugh was a city in Iron County in the U.S. state of Michigan.  In the 2000 census, the city population was 1,243.

Effective July 1, 2000, the city of Stambaugh and the village of Mineral Hills were both consolidated with the city of Iron River.  The city was adjacent to Stambaugh Township, but was administratively autonomous.

History
Stambaugh was named for John Stambaugh, a mine owner.

Geography

Demographics
As of the census of 2000, there were 1,243 people, 587 households, and 338 families residing in the city. The racial makeup of the city was 95.74% White, 2.33% Native American, 0.32% Asian, 0.24% from other races, and 1.37% from two or more races. Hispanic or Latino of any race were 0.48% of the population.

There were 587 households, out of which 25.2% had children under the age of 18 living with them, 41.6% were married couples living together, 12.1% had a female householder with no husband present, and 42.4% were non-families. 39.2% of all households were made up of individuals, and 25.4% had someone living alone who was 65 years of age or older.  The average household size was 2.12 and the average family size was 2.80.

In the city the population was spread out, with 23.6% under the age of 18, 6.8% from 18 to 24, 21.8% from 25 to 44, 21.6% from 45 to 64, and 26.2% who were 65 years of age or older.  The median age was 43 years. For every 100 females there were 83.1 males.  For every 100 females age 18 and over, there were 81.3 males.

The median income for a household in the city was $23,643, and the median income for a family was $31,118. Males had a median income of $28,750 versus $20,625 for females. The per capita income for the city was $15,890.  About 10.7% of families and 13.5% of the population were below the poverty line, including 21.3% of those under age 18 and 8.3% of those age 65 or over.

References

Geography of Iron County, Michigan
Former cities in Michigan
Populated places disestablished in 2000